The Plomo Mummy (also known as Boy of El Plomo, El Plomo Mummy, or La Momia del Cerro El Plomo in Spanish) is the well preserved remains of an Incan child found on Cerro El Plomo near Santiago, Chile in 1954. It was discovered by Guillermo Chacón Carrasco, Jaime Ríos Abarca, and Luis Gerardo Ríos Barrueto. The mummy was brought to the attention of Grete Mostny at the Chilean National Museum of Natural History; she later proved instrumental in the museum's acquisition of the specimen. The Plomo Mummy was the first notable frozen mummy discovery of high-altitude Capacocha human sacrifice by the Incas, a practice called qhapaq hucha.

The original mummy was on display until 1982, when it was determined that in order to maintain its preservation it would be better to replace it with a replica. The mummy is curated by the National Museum of Natural History in Santiago, Chile, and the replica of the mummy is currently on public display.

Burial 
The El Plomo mummy was excellently preserved due to high altitude and low humidity conditions. It was located in a 1 meter deep pit, covered with a capstone in one of several small stone structures. The child was in a sitting position, hugging his knees. The reason for this boy's death was for ritual child sacrifice. The cause of death is uncertain, but is likely due to suffocation after being buried alive. Vomit stains were found around the boy's lips and on his clothing. A possible explanation for this is that he was being given maize beer and coca to induce numbing effects for the sacrifice.

The body was fully clothed; most of the articles of clothing were made from alpaca or llama wool. His garb consisted of a black sleeveless tunic, a large grey shawl, a headdress decorated with condor feathers. There were unused leather moccasins on his feet and a headband was used to keep his hair in place. He was also wearing two pieces of silver jewelry, a heavy bracelet and an H-shaped pendant, both of which indicates a high or elite social status.

Buried along with the body were several grave goods. These include several figurines, a silver female idol dressed in miniature clothes, a llama covered in gold, and another llama made from a red shell. A small woven bag contained coca leaves which still produced a fragrance. Finally, several balls made from animal intestines contained human hair, fingernail clippings, and teeth. Along with the sacrifice of the child himself, these objects are used to appease the mountain deities to stop disastrous natural events, promote good weather and fertility, or for other religious events.

Discovery 
On February 1, 1954, the mummified body of a pre-Columbian child was discovered by a group of climbers at the peak of the El Plomo mountain (at an altitude of 17,716 feet) located in the Andes mountain range near Santiago, Chile. Guillermo Chacón Carrasco, Luis Gerardo Ríos Barrueto, and Jaime Ríos Abarca departed the village of Puente Alto, near Santiago, late January. They were muleteers who went on a short expedition in hopes of finding artifacts and ritual offerings that they could later sell. Once they reached the peak of the El Plomo mountain, they came across a ceremonial complex which consisted of four stone structures. Under one of these structures they found the tomb of the mummy and grave goods surrounding it. They decided to take the grave goods, but relocated the frozen body to another cave, and left to go back to Puente Alto with the goods they collected throughout their expedition. A few weeks later, they traveled to Santiago in an attempt to sell the artifacts to the Museo Nacional de Historia Natural (Chilean National Museum of Natural History). On February 16, 1954, one of the men that found the mummy informed Dr. Grete Mostny of the discovery, who was at that time the Head of Anthropology at the Chilean National Museum of Natural History. Mostny and the men that discovered the mummy came to a monetary agreement, and the mummy was handed over to the museum.

It was determined that the mummy was an Incan boy, who was sacrificed for Capacocha when he was approximately eight years old. The mummy was named "La Momia del Cerro el Plomo" after his discovery's location. His body was extremely well preserved and studies and examinations were made before it was displayed in a glass freezer at the Chilean National Museum of Natural History. The mummy was discovered fully clothed in a sitting position with his arms wrapped around his knees. His hair had been carefully braided into over 200 braids and was held back with a headband made from human hair. His face was painted with red and ochre stripes 

Currently, a replica is displayed instead of the real mummy in order to preserve its remains better. El Plomo mummy is currently still kept at the Chilean National Museum of Natural History, but in a chamber with controlled humidity and temperature.

Scientific Examinations 
The mummy was remarkably well preserved due to the high altitudes, low temperatures, and low humidity. Incan Capacocha sacrifices have distinct archaeological characteristics that allow them to be identified: the sacrifices are made at high altitudes, it is usually children who have been sacrificed, and there are grave goods at the site of discovery.

It was determined that the cause of death was that he was buried alive. When it came to Capacocha sacrifices, the Incas would intoxicate the child chosen for sacrifice with chicha, an alcoholic beverage, and coca leaves. The child was found wrapped around a tunic made out of llama wool, and trimmed with llama fur. The tunic was found with a vomit stain in the front, which was evidence for the use of chicha.

When the mummy was originally discovered in 1954, limited examinations were made to the body due to the time period. Roentgenograms (X-ray images) were performed in order to examine the mummy's skeleton, and a coprolite analysis was made. In 1982, after the mummy was displayed in the glass freezer, some cracks were found in the epidermis of one of the mummy's hands. The International Heritage Branch of UNESCO was contacted and asked to come in in order to perform more examinations. A six-week-long study was performed on the mummy in order to learn more about its remains. New X-ray images were taken, and along with dental and calcification examinations it was determined that when the boy was sacrificed he had been around eight years old. It was also determined that the skeleton showed no signs of trauma, and the organs were intact. The epidermis was hard, but the bottom layers were still soft. It was decided that the skin would be left intact and a biopsy of the organs would not be made, in order to protect the inner layers against microorganisms that might damage the well-preserved mummy. Electron microscopic studies done on verrucae of the boy's hand showed viruses, which were the first viruses found on an ancient mummy.  

In 2003 a third study was done, and a 3D reconstruction of the mummy was created by the Hospital Clínico de la Universidad de Chile. They were also able to determine the mummy's blood type and conduct a DNA study

See also
Children of Llullaillaco
Mummy Juanita
Ötzi the Iceman

References

Further reading
 (p. 126, 157)
 (p. 381)

External links
Image of the mummy at the Museo Nacional de Historia Natural

1954 archaeological discoveries
Andean mummies
Archaeology of Chile
Human remains (archaeological)
Human sacrifice